252 East 57th Street is a mixed use modernist style residential skyscraper in Midtown Manhattan, New York City, developed by the World Wide Group and Rose Associates, Inc. Construction started in 2013. The building is part of a luxury residential corridor along 57th Street called Billionaires' Row. The residential tower and additional retail portions were anticipated to open in late 2016, and the project was largely complete by 2017.

Architecture
The building was designed by Roger Duffy of Skidmore, Owings & Merrill. The building’s curved glass design is based on Alvar Aalto’s Aalto Vase of Finnish design created in 1936. The interiors are designed by AD100 designer Daniel Romauldez. It is Romauldez’s first new development commission, having previously designed private homes for celebrities Aerin Lauder, Tory Burch, Daphne Guinness, and Mick Jagger.

Amenities 
The building includes a private gated porte-cochère, automated parking, swimming pool, sauna, steam, and ice rooms. The 34th  amenity floor will comprise a library, screening room, dining room, terrace, and fitness center with pilates, yoga, and private training studios. The building will also house two furnished guest suites.

References

External links 

 

Residential buildings completed in 2016
Residential condominiums in New York City
Residential skyscrapers in Manhattan
Skidmore, Owings & Merrill buildings
Midtown Manhattan
Skyscrapers on 57th Street (Manhattan)